Vitaly Lazarevich Ginzburg, ForMemRS (4 October 1916 – 8 November 2009) was a Russian physicist who was honored with the Nobel Prize in Physics in 2003, together with Alexei Abrikosov and Anthony Leggett for their "pioneering contributions to the theory of superconductors and superfluids."

His career in physics was spent in the former Soviet Union and was one of the leading figure in former  Soviet program of nuclear weapons, working towards designs of the thermonuclear devices. He became a member of the  Russian Academy of Sciences and succeeded Igor Tamm as head of the Department of Theoretical Physics of the Lebedev Physical Institute of the Russian Academy of Sciences (FIAN). In his later life, Ginzburg become an outspoken atheist and was critical of clergy's influence in Russian society.

Biography
Vitaly Ginzburg was born to a Jewish family in Moscow on 4 October 1916— the son of an engineer, Lazar Yefimovich Ginzburg, and a doctor, Augusta Wildauer who was a graduate from the Physics Faculty of Moscow State University in 1938. After attending his mother's alma mater, he defended his qualifications of the candidate's (Kandidat Nauk) dissertation in 1940, and his comprehensive thesis for the doctor's (Doktor Nauk) qualification in 1942. In 1944, he became a member of the Communist Party of the Soviet Union. Among his achievements are a partially phenomenological theory of superconductivity, the Ginzburg–Landau theory, developed with Lev Landau in 1950; the theory of electromagnetic wave propagation in plasmas (for example, in the ionosphere); and a theory of the origin of cosmic radiation. He is also known to biologists as being part of the group of scientists that helped bring down the reign of the politically connected anti-Mendelian agronomist Trofim Lysenko, thus allowing modern genetic science to return to the USSR.

In 1937, Ginzburg married Olga Zamsha. In 1946, he married his second wife, Nina Ginzburg (nee Yermakova), who had spent more than a year in custody on fabricated charges of plotting to assassinate the Soviet leader Joseph Stalin.

Ginzburg was the editor-in-chief of the scientific journal Uspekhi Fizicheskikh Nauk. He also headed the Academic Department of Physics and Astrophysics Problems, which Ginzburg founded at the Moscow Institute of Physics and Technology in 1968.

Ginzburg identified as a secular Jew, and following the collapse of communism in the former Soviet Union, he was very active in Jewish life, especially in Russia, where he served on the board of directors of the Russian Jewish Congress. He is also well known for fighting anti-Semitism and supporting the state of Israel.

In the 2000s (decade), Ginzburg was politically active, supporting the Russian liberal opposition and human rights movement. He defended Igor Sutyagin and Valentin Danilov against charges of espionage put forth by the authorities. On 2 April 2009, in an interview to the Radio Liberty Ginzburg denounced the FSB as an institution harmful to Russia and the ongoing expansion of its authority as a return to Stalinism.

Ginzburg worked at the P. N. Lebedev Physical Institute of Soviet and Russian Academy of Sciences in Moscow since 1940. Russian Academy of Sciences is a major institution where mostly all Nobel Prize laureates of physics from Russia have done their studies and/or research works.

Stance on religion
Ginzburg was an avowed atheist, both under the militantly atheist Soviet government and in post-Communist Russia when religion made a strong revival. He criticized clericalism in the press and wrote several books devoted to the questions of religion and atheism. Because of this, some Orthodox Christian groups denounced him and said no science award could excuse his verbal attacks on the Russian Orthodox Church. He was one of the signers of the Open letter to the President Vladimir V. Putin from the Members of the Russian Academy of Sciences against clericalisation of Russia.

Death
A spokeswoman for the Russian Academy of Sciences announced that Ginzburg died in Moscow on 8 November 2009 from cardiac arrest. He had been suffering from ill health for several years, and three years before his death said "In general, I envy believers. I am 90, and [am] being overcome by illnesses. For believers, it is easier to deal with them and with life's other hardships. But what can be done? I cannot believe in resurrection after death."

Prime Minister of Russia Vladimir Putin sent his condolences to Ginzburg's family, saying "We bid farewell to an extraordinary personality whose outstanding talent, exceptional strength of character and firmness of convictions evoked true respect from his colleagues". President of Russia Dmitry Medvedev, in his letter of condolences, described Ginzburg as a "top physicist of our time whose discoveries had a huge impact on the development of national and world science."

Ginzburg was buried on 11 November in the Novodevichy Cemetery in Moscow, the resting place of many famous politicians, writers and scientists of Russia.

Honors and awards

 Medal "For Valiant Labour in the Great Patriotic War 1941–1945" (1946)
 Medal "In Commemoration of the 800th Anniversary of Moscow" (1948)
 Stalin Prize in 1953
 Order of Lenin (1954)
 Order of the Badge of Honour, twice (1954, 1975)
 Order of the Red Banner of Labour, twice (1956, 1986)
 Lenin Prize in 1966
 Medal "For Valiant Labour. To commemorate the 100th anniversary of the birth of Vladimir Ilyich Lenin" (1970)
 Marian Smoluchowski Medal (1984)
 Elected a Foreign Member of the Royal Society (ForMemRS) in 1987
 Gold Medal of the Royal Astronomical Society in 1991
 Wolf Prize in Physics in 1994/5
 Vavilov Gold Medal (1995) – for outstanding work in physics, including a series of papers on the theory of radiation by uniformly moving sources
 Lomonosov Gold Medal in 1995  – for outstanding achievement in the field of theoretical physics and astrophysics
 3rd class (3 October 1996) – for outstanding scientific achievements and the training of highly qualified personnel
 Elected a  Fellow of the American Physical Society in 2003.
 Nobel Prize in Physics in 2003, together with Alexei Alexeyevich Abrikosov and Anthony James Leggett for their "pioneering contributions to the theory of superconductors and superfluids"
 Order "For Merit to the Fatherland", 1st class (4 October 2006) – for outstanding contribution to the development of national science and many years of fruitful activity

References

External links

  including the Nobel Lecture On Superconductivity and Superfluidity
 Ginzburg's homepage
 Curriculum Vitae
 Open letter to the President of the Russian Federation Vladimir V. Putin
 Obituary The Daily Telegraph 11 Nov 2009.
 Obituary The Independent November 14, 2009 (by Martin Childs).
  Biography
  Obituary

1916 births
2009 deaths
Scientists from Moscow
People from Moskovsky Uyezd
Russian Jews
Communist Party of the Soviet Union members
Members of the Congress of People's Deputies of the Soviet Union
Russian atheism activists
Jewish atheists
Jewish Russian physicists
Jewish scientists
Nuclear weapons program of the Soviet Union
Soviet astronomers
Soviet inventors
Soviet physicists
Theoretical physicists
Superconductivity
Academic journal editors
Moscow State University alumni
Academic staff of the Moscow Institute of Physics and Technology
Full Members of the USSR Academy of Sciences
Full Members of the Russian Academy of Sciences
Foreign associates of the National Academy of Sciences
Foreign Fellows of the Indian National Science Academy
Fellows of the American Physical Society
Foreign Members of the Royal Society
Stalin Prize winners
Lenin Prize winners
Recipients of the Gold Medal of the Royal Astronomical Society
Recipients of the Lomonosov Gold Medal
Recipients of the Order "For Merit to the Fatherland", 1st class
Recipients of the Order of Lenin
Recipients of the Order of the Red Banner of Labour
Nobel laureates in Physics
Russian Nobel laureates

Wolf Prize in Physics laureates

UNESCO Niels Bohr Medal recipients
Burials at Novodevichy Cemetery